Fort Loreto (Spanish: Fuerte de Loreto) is a fort in the city of Puebla, in the Mexican state of Puebla.

See also
 Fort Guadalupe

References

External links

 Museo del Fuerte de Loreto at inah.gob.mx

Buildings and structures in Puebla (city)
Forts in Mexico